Thakor is a surname, deriving from Thakor, a title of the Koli caste of Gujarat.

People with the name include:

Given name
Thakor Patel (born 1932), Indian-born Zimbabwean painter

Surname
Alpeshji Thakor, Indian politician
Bapu Velnath Thakor, saint of Girnar, Gujarat from  Kshatriya koli community
Dilipkumar Viraji Thakor (born 1959), Indian politician
Gabhaji Mangaji Thakor, Indian politician
Jagdish Thakor, Indian politician
Kamlesh Thakor (born 1992), Indian cricketer
Kanaji Thakor, Indian politician 
Nitish V. Thakor (born 1952), American biomedical engineering professor
Shambhuji Thakor, Indian politician
Shiv Thakor (born 1993), English cricketer
Vikram Thakor, Indian film actor, musician and singer

See also
 
 Thakore, a name
 Thakur (disambiguation)

References